In mathematics, the term quartic describes something that pertains to the "fourth order", such as the function . It may refer to one of the following:

 Quartic function, a polynomial function of degree 4
 Quartic equation, a polynomial equation of degree 4
 Quartic curve, an algebraic curve of degree 4
 Quartic reciprocity, a theorem from number theory
 Quartic surface, a surface defined by an equation of degree 4

 See also
 
 
 Quart (disambiguation)
 Quintic, relating to degree 5, as next higher above quartic
 Cubic (disambiguation), relating to degree 3 or a cube, as next lower below quartic